Howa wa Heya, (“Him and Her”, “ هو و هي” ) is a 1985 Egyptian television drama, starring Soad Hosni and Ahmed Zaki.

Plot
Howa wa Heya is a television series played for the first time in 1985, with a new story in each episode presented during the month of Ramadan in the Egyptian television and Arab televisions.

Cast
"Souad Hosni" as Heya
"Ahmed Zaki" as Howa
"Zahret Al Ola"
"Mohsen Sarhan"
"Mahmoud El Guindi"
"Ahmed Bedir "

See also
 List of Egyptian television series

References
"Souad Hosny"Soad Hosny
"Ahmed Zaki"Ahmad Zaki (actor)
"Salah Jahin"Salah Jahin
" هو_وهي_مسلسل" :ar:هو وهي (مسلسل)

External links
Howa wa Heya, Soundtrack حسني / هو و هي

1985 Egyptian television series debuts
1985 Egyptian television series endings
1980s Egyptian television series
Egyptian drama television series